Actinodaphne menghaiensis is a species of tree belonging to the family Lauraceae. It is only known from Menghai County, Yunnan in the People's Republic of China.

This tree, growing to 8 m tall, is found in dense, humid forest. Whorls of five or six leaves, up to 40 cm long, are borne at the ends of branchlets. It is very similar to Actinodaphne obovata but can be distinguished by the glabrous branchlets, leaves and buds; and smaller fruits with more slender pedicels.

References

menghaiensis
Plants described in 2005